Oluwasegun Abiodun (born 5 December 1984) is a Nigerian football striker who currently is free agent. His name, Oluwasegun, means "God has been victorious".

Career

Club

Early career
His previous clubs include Nigerian team Julius Berger, Israeli Maccabi Haifa and Al-Wahda in the United Arab Emirates. Abiodun arrived at Maccabi Haifa to replace Yakubu, but after the latter stayed with the Israeli club Abiodun left Haifa. His first match for the club was a successful one since he got onto the scoresheet in an early round UEFA Champions League match after starting the match on the bench.

Norway
He moved from Al Wahda to Hamarkameratene in September 2004. While at Hamarkameratene he became noted for his goalscoring abilities and speed. In December 2008 it was announced that Abiodun would join Skeid for the 2009 season

National team
Abiodun has played for the Nigerian Olympic team who came very close at qualifying for the 2004 Olympics. but has never featured for the senior squad.

Career statistics

References

External links
Player biography for Oluwasegun Abiodun at hamkam.no
Player biography for Briskebybanden.no
Player statistics at Norwegian international player statistics
Profile at skeid.no
Ovidon Olishigon - אובידון אולושיגון 

Nigerian footballers
Nigerian expatriate footballers
Bridge F.C. players
Nigerian expatriate sportspeople in Israel
Maccabi Haifa F.C. players
Al Wahda FC players
Expatriate footballers in Israel
Expatriate footballers in the United Arab Emirates
Expatriate footballers in Norway
Eliteserien players
Hamarkameratene players
Nigerian expatriate sportspeople in the United Arab Emirates
Skeid Fotball players
Yoruba sportspeople
1984 births
Living people
Nigerian expatriate sportspeople in Norway
UAE Pro League players
Association football forwards
People from Maiduguri